"Three Days" is a song on Jane's Addiction's 1990 album, Ritual de lo Habitual. It is a three-part song that meditates on death and rebirth. The guitar solo by Dave Navarro was ranked as number 100 in Guitar Worlds "100 best guitar solos" article.

Lyrical meaning
The song was inspired by Xiola Blue, a friend of Perry Farrell, who came to Los Angeles, possibly around the time of her father's funeral  and spent three days with Farrell and his partner Casey Niccoli, in a "haze of sex and drugs". Blue was also the muse behind Xiola, a song recorded by Farrell's first band Psi-Com. Xiola died aged 18 of a heroin overdose in New York City, June 1987. 'Three Days' was written before her death.

Alternate versions
A live version of the song appears on the band's 1997 rarities compilation Kettle Whistle. This version appears on the soundtrack of Richard Kelly's 2007 film Southland Tales, which repeatedly quotes the "Shadows of the morning light" section of the lyrics and revolves around the final three days before the end of the world. The original version made an appearance in the 1992 film Singles, a movie about the alternative rock scene in the early 1990s. However, it was not included on the soundtrack.

Track listing

References

1990 songs
1990 singles
Jane's Addiction songs
Songs about drugs
Songs inspired by deaths
American progressive rock songs
Warner Records singles